FSST may refer to
 A speech synthesizer distributed by Votrax
 Falling-stage systems tracts in sequence stratigraphy